Rivalry between the Universities of Oxford and Cambridge is a phenomenon going back many centuries. During most of that time, they were the only two universities in England and Wales, making the rivalry more intense than it is now.

The University of Oxford and the University of Cambridge, sometimes collectively known as Oxbridge, are the two oldest universities in England. Both were founded more than 800 years ago, and between them they have produced a large number of Britain's most prominent scientists, writers, and politicians, as well as noted figures in many other fields. Yet for many of these centuries the two universities were unrecognisable as universities in the modern sense, as they were largely institutions for producing clergymen and were thus strongly tied to the Church. Competition between Oxford and Cambridge also has a long history, dating back to around 1208 when Cambridge was founded by scholars taking refuge from hostile townsmen in Oxford.

Direct competition between the two universities
Many annual competitions are held between Oxford and Cambridge, including the annual Boat Race. First contested in 1829, the race pits Cambridge University Boat Club against their Oxford counterparts over a four-mile (6 km) stretch of the River Thames. The very first Boat Race was won by Oxford, but Cambridge lead the overall series with 85 wins to Oxford's 80, with one dead heat in 1877.

The other major Oxbridge competitions are the Rugby Union and Rugby League Varsity Match, the former being a rugby union game played annually in December at Twickenham stadium. Cambridge currently has 64 wins, Oxford has 60 (Cambridge won the most recent match in December 2019), and 14 games have ended in draws. The Rugby Football Union chose to advertise the 2006 match with a campaign promoting inter-university rivalry: their advertising agency Lowe London produced posters showing the number of Prime Ministers produced by the universities (Oxford 26 – Cambridge 14), with the tagline "It's time to get even".

The Rugby League Varsity Match is a rugby league game played annually in March at The Stoop. Whilst not having the history of its Union counterpart, the fixture has been contested for over 30 years, and is broadcast live on Sky Sports. Cambridge currently lead the series 16–14, with one draw in 1994.

The Boat Race and the two Varsity Matches are notable in the UK in that they are the only university sports events that have any public profile outside the universities themselves; all three are screened live on national television and are widely covered in the national media.

All other significant sports have their own varsity match at some point during the year; some of these, such as the cricket fixture, the Ice Hockey Varsity Match and the Varsity Polo Match have attracted significant attention in the past. The results of all the varsity matches in The Varsity Games are aggregated and each year one university wins the Varsity Games title. Sportsmen who have competed at a Varsity Match in the prestigious Full Blue sports are eligible for an Oxford Blue or Cambridge Blue respectively.

At direct sporting competitions the rivalry can be heard in the customary insults used by members of each University. 'Shoe the Tabs', derived from Cantabridgian, is traditionally used by those from Oxford. Likewise, 'GDBO', or God Damn Bloody Oxford, is the response from Cambridge.

Oxbridge co-operation
Despite the impassioned rivalry between the two universities, there is also much cooperation when the need arises. Most Oxford colleges have a sister college in Cambridge. Some Oxford and Cambridge colleges with the same or similar names are 'sisters': for example, Jesus College, Cambridge, and Jesus College, Oxford, or Magdalen College, Oxford and Magdalene College, Cambridge. However, namesakes are not always paired up: for example, St John's College, Oxford, is the sister college of Sidney Sussex College, Cambridge, while St John's College, Cambridge, is the sister college of Balliol College, Oxford. Arrangements between sister colleges vary, but may include reciprocal offers of accommodation to students from the other university when they are visiting. Furthermore, a significant proportion of academic staff has at some point been a member of the "other place".

Concerns are often raised that Oxford and Cambridge do not project a socially inclusive image to potential applicants from state schools, and thus Oxbridge students are disproportionately from wealthy backgrounds. The two universities have made individual and combined efforts in recent years to promote themselves to potential applicants from disadvantaged backgrounds. Each year, the Universities spend around £8 million on access schemes, and there is a designated Access Officer in every JCR and students' union.

Graduates of both universities are eligible for membership of the Oxford and Cambridge Club, a private members' club in London.

See also
 College rivalry
 Golden triangle (universities)
 King's College London–UCL rivalry
 The London Varsity
 Russell Group

References

External links
 University of Cambridge
 University of Oxford
 The Boat Race
 The Varsity Match
 Oxbridge Student Conferences
 Oxford Journal — It's Not Duke-North Carolina, but Oxford-Cambridge Is Unrivaled, New York Times

Oxbridge
Culture of the University of Oxford
Culture of the University of Cambridge
English culture
Academic culture
Rivalry

zh:牛桥